Heike Schulte-Mattler, née Schmidt (born 27 May 1958 in Oberhausen) is a German athlete who competed mainly in the 400 metres.

She competed for West Germany in the 1984 Summer Olympics held in Los Angeles, U.S. in the 4 x 400 metres where she won the bronze medal with her teammates Ute Thimm, Heidi-Elke Gaugel and Gaby Bußmann.

References

Sports Reference

1958 births
Living people
Sportspeople from Oberhausen
West German female sprinters
Athletes (track and field) at the 1984 Summer Olympics
Olympic athletes of West Germany
Olympic bronze medalists for West Germany
Medalists at the 1984 Summer Olympics
Olympic bronze medalists in athletics (track and field)
Olympic female sprinters